The following are the national records in track cycling in Armenia maintained by the Armenian Cycling Federation.

Men

Women

References

Armenia
Records
Track cycling
track cycling